Ethelred Sorzano (born 23 June 1950) is a Trinidadian cricketer. He played in fourteen first-class matches for Trinidad and Tobago from 1974 to 1979.

See also
 List of Trinidadian representative cricketers

References

External links
 

1950 births
Living people
Trinidad and Tobago cricketers